The Speech at the Ceremony of the Proclamation of the Congo's Independence was a short political speech given by Patrice Lumumba on 30 June 1960 at the ceremonies marking the independence of the Republic of Congo (the modern-day Democratic Republic of the Congo) from Belgium. It is best known for its outspoken criticism of colonialism.

Lumumba, the first Congolese Prime Minister, gave the address during the official independence commemorations at the Palais de la Nation in Léopoldville (modern-day Kinshasa). The ceremony was intended to mark the harmonious end of Belgian rule and was attended by both Congolese and Belgian dignitaries, including King Baudouin. Lumumba's speech, which was itself unscheduled, was in large part a response to Baudouin's speech which argued that the end of colonial rule in the Congo had been depicted as the culmination of the Belgian "civilising mission" begun by Leopold II in the Congo Free State. Lumumba's speech, broadcast live on the radio across the world, denounced colonialism and was interpreted as an affront to Belgium and Baudouin personally. While it was well-received within the Congo, it was widely condemned internationally as unnecessarily confrontational and for showing ingratitude at a time when Belgium had granted independence to the state. The speech nearly provoked a diplomatic incident between the Congo and Belgium, and Lumumba later gave further speeches attempting to adopt a more conciliatory tone.

The speech itself has since been praised for its use of political rhetoric, and is considered a landmark moment in the independence of the Congo. It has also been cited as a contributary factor to the subsequent Congo Crisis and in Lumumba's murder in 1961. Since its delivery, the speech has been widely reprinted and has been depicted in paintings and film.

Background

Colonial rule in the Congo began in the late 19th century. King Leopold II of Belgium, frustrated by Belgium's lack of international power and prestige, attempted to persuade the Belgian government to support colonial expansion around the then-largely unvisited Congo Basin. The Belgian government's ambivalence about the idea led Leopold to eventually create the colony on his own account. With support from a number of Western countries, who viewed Leopold as a useful buffer between rival colonial powers, Leopold achieved international recognition for a personal colony, the Congo Free State, in 1885. By the turn of the century, however, the atrocities committed by the Free State officials against indigenous Congolese and the ruthless system of economic extraction had led to intense diplomatic pressure on Belgium to take official control of the country, which it did in 1908, creating the Belgian Congo.

Belgian rule in the Congo was based around the "colonial trinity" (trinité coloniale) of state, missionary and private company interests. The privileging of Belgian commercial interests meant that large amounts of capital flowed into the Congo and that individual regions became specialised. On many occasions, the interests of the government and private enterprise became closely tied and the state helped companies break strikes and remove other barriers imposed by the indigenous population. The country was split into nesting, hierarchically organised administrative subdivisions, and run uniformly according to a set "native policy" (politique indigène)—in contrast to the British and the French, who generally favoured the system of indirect rule whereby traditional leaders were retained in positions of authority under colonial oversight. There was also a high degree of racial segregation. Large numbers of whites that moved to the Congo after the end of World War II came from across the social spectrum, but were nonetheless always treated as superior to blacks.

An African nationalist movement developed in the Belgian Congo during the 1950s, primarily among the black middle-class évolués. The movement was divided into a number of parties and groups which were broadly divided on ethnic and geographical lines and opposed to one another. The largest, the Mouvement National Congolais (MNC), was a united front organisation dedicated to achieving independence "within a reasonable" time and was led by, among others, Patrice Lumumba. The MNC's main rival was the Alliance des Bakongo (ABAKO), led by Joseph Kasa-Vubu, who advocated a more radical ideology than the MNC, based around calls for immediate independence and the promotion of regional identity. In the aftermath of rioting in the capital Léopoldville (modern-day Kinshasa) in 1959, the independence of the Congo was agreed to be granted on 30 June 1960 and a constitution (loi fondamentale) was written, creating a semi-presidential constitution. Kasa-Vubu was proclaimed President, and Lumumba Prime Minister.

The speech

Background and context
The speech was given as part of the official ceremony held at the Palais de la Nation in Léopoldville (modern-day Kinshasa) marking the end of Belgian colonial rule in the country.

The official programme for the Independence Day celebrations began with a Te Deum at the Cathedral of Notre-Dame-du-Congo. The service began at 9:00 am, after which delegates returned to the Palais de la Nation which had been the residency of the Belgian Governor-General of the Congo. Some leading Congolese musicians, notably Joseph Kabaselleh and his band, Le Grand Kallé et l'African Jazz, performed specially-written songs commemorating independence there until 11:00 am. These included Indépendance Cha Cha, one of Kabaselleh's best-known works. After this, the official speeches—the main component of the day's festivities—began. In the audience were dignitaries from both Belgium and the Congo as well as the international press.

King Baudouin, representing Belgium, gave the first speech in which he praised the "genius" of his ancestor, King Leopold II, who began the colonisation of the Congo on his own initiative in the 1880s. Baudouin depicted the end of colonial rule in the Congo as the culmination of the Belgian "civilising mission" and spoke of the close relations he hoped would be maintained between the two countries. The thousands of Congolese listening via loudspeakers outside the Palais were infuriated. Following the end of the speech Kasa-Vubu, as president, gave a short and uncontroversial address thanking the King for his attendance and for his best wishes. Both speeches were applauded vigorously. In a change to the schedule, Joseph Kasongo, the President of the Chamber of Deputies who was presiding over the ceremonies, invited Lumumba to give an address as Lumumba had requested him to do so. The invitation came as a surprise to the audience, who had not expected Lumumba, as Prime Minister, to take any part in the ceremony.

Kasongo and Thomas Kanza, a member of Lumumba's government, had been requested to visit Lumumba at his private house on the morning of 30 June before the start of the ceremonies to look over an early draft of Lumumba's planned speech. Also present were two secretaries of state and two Belgians. (One of the latter may have been the pacifist Jean Van Lierde.) Lumumba asked Kanza, "Will you work out here with these others here to tidy up the text, and make it acceptable – a bit less explosive?"

Less than an hour before the independence ceremony a Belgian officer arrived to request that Lumumba depart for Parliament. Kasongo was disturbed by what Lumumba planned to say and told Kanza as he left, "I'm counting on you to do your best to tone down that speech." As Lumumba dressed, Kanza and one of the secretaries, André Mandi, read through as much of the speech as they could, replacing some individual words with less inflammatory language and crossing out several full paragraphs deemed too difficult to temper. Lumumba then left in a motorcade for his official residence to rendezvous with the rest of his government. Kanza and Mandi followed in the second car, making additional revisions to the speech. These were so extensive that both feared Lumumba would be unable to clearly read his remarks. Upon their arrival at the residence, Kanza and Mandi briefly explained their alterations to Lumumba. Greatly pleased with the result, Lumumba stated that he would read some parts of the speech verbatim, then improvise to respond to the atmosphere in the room as he saw fit. He made his own alterations to the script during the speeches given by Baudouin and Kasa-Vubu.

Content

The speech begins with Lumumba addressing his speech to the Congolese people and praising independence as the culmination of the struggle of the nationalist movement, rather than the result of Belgian concessions. He outlines the personal suffering of the nationalists before enumerating the suffering of ordinary Congolese people under colonialism, through forced labour, systematic racial discrimination, land seizure, wealth disparity and physical maltreatment at the hand of the colonial state.

Lumumba states that these forms of suffering would be ended by independence. Through its democratic institutions, Congolese self-government would deliver social justice and fair wages. Racial discrimination and repression would be abolished and the Congo would become "the pride of Africa" and an example to the Pan-African movement. Lumumba called upon other states, particularly Belgium, to support the Congo to establish mutually beneficial relations between the "two equal and independent countries". He also appealed to the Congolese to abandon internecine tribal factionalism.

Concluding, Lumumba appealed to all the Congolese to make sacrifices for the future of the Congo. Lumumba finally called for Congolese people to respect the rights of non-indigenous settlers in the country, and warned that if they breached Congolese laws they would be exiled. The speech finishes with the observation that "the Congo's independence is a decisive step towards the liberation of the whole African continent" and the exclamations "Long live independence and African unity! Long live the independent and sovereign Congo!"

The speech was originally delivered in the French language.

Analysis
The speech has been praised for its use of political rhetoric. In particular, the speech has been cited as exemplifying the three functions of rhetoric; by the way it was framed within the independence proceeding, its deliberative function and oratorical vibrancy. Others have argued that the dynamics between Lumumba, Kasa-Vubu and Baudouin during the ceremony "represent a microcosm of the relations between Africans and Europeans" in early post-colonial Africa, with each representing a different stance towards the others.

Political scientist Georges Nzongola-Ntalaja hailed the speech as a "classic of African nationalism" and praised for providing a response to the "patronizing" speech given by Baudouin or as an example of speaking the truth to power. It was also praised as a public exposé of traits of colonialism glossed over during the independence ceremonies.

Political scientist Jean-Claude Willame argued that the speech was the result of Lumumba's growing frustration with the process of independence which he believed might represent a purely nominal change in government with no real effects. Lumumba blamed Kasa-Vubu and his colleagues for failing to publicly oppose this situation. Gender historian Karen Bouwer therefore argued that the speech was the result of Lumumba's growing feeling of emasculation. Others have pointed to the influence of Belgian Socialist delegates and representatives of the Guinean President, Ahmed Sékou Touré, who had a strongly Marxist ideology, all of whom hoped a public and international denunciation of colonialism would help them politically.

Historian David Van Reybrouck praised the speech as "memorable", but argued that it damaged Lumumba's own legacy. Since Lumumba and his party represented only a third of Congolese popular opinion, Van Reybrouck accused Lumumba's claim to speak for all Congolese people "divisive" and questioned whether it was appropriate given the context: "Lumumba's address contained more of a look back than a look forward, more rage than hope, more rancour than magnanimity, and therefore more rebellion than statesmanship". He also compared it to the Communist Julien Lahaut's republican heckling of Baudouin's coronation in 1950. Like Lumumba, Lahaut was subsequently murdered after he had "claimed all the attention" at the public event.

Reception

The speech was applauded by Congolese delegates in the audience at the Palais de la Nation and broadcast by radio across the country. It was also broadcast live in Belgium by the state broadcaster, RTBF. After its delivery, the ceremonies were halted. Baudouin marched out of the room. A short inspection of local sites was arranged with Kasa-Vubu and lunch was served to cover the delay and an official lunch was held by the Congo River. Congolese Minister of Foreign Affairs Justin Marie Bomboko convinced Baudouin not to leave the celebrations, assuring him that Lumumba would clarify his intent in further remarks. After the break, Lumumba was persuaded by the outgoing Belgian resident, Walter Ganshof van der Meersch, to give a second speech which attempted to strike a more conciliatory tone between the two countries. In his second speech, Lumumba praised Baudouin and stated that "I would not wish my feelings to be wrongly interpreted". After Lumumba's second speech, the official act of independence was signed by Lumumba and the Belgian Prime Minister Gaston Eyskens, as well as by the foreign ministers of both countries, bringing the official ceremonies to an end. The delegates then visited a performance of Congolese folklore at the Roi Baudouin Stadium before heading to an evening reception. At this event, Lumumba gave a further conciliatory speech the same evening, written for him by Eyskens, and drank a toast to Baudouin. The King, and much of the Belgian delegation, returned to Brussels on 1 July. He did not come back to the Congo until June 1970.

The majority international reaction was extremely critical of Lumumba. Instead of directly reproducing the speech, most publications paraphrased it in negative terms. Lumumba's attack on colonialism was especially interpreted as an attack on Belgium itself and nearly provoked a diplomatic incident between the two countries. Belgian media reaction to the address marked a dramatic shift in the press' coverage of him towards a more negative tone. International observers thought the speech unwise, ungrateful and tactless. The confrontational attitude taken by Lumumba appeared to confirm Belgian and American suspicions that Lumumba was a dangerous radical. When interviewed about the incident, Eyskens said "this speech caused a lot of disappointment" but pointed to Lumumba's subsequent conciliatory remarks with pleasure. Lumumba, for his part, was greatly annoyed by the Belgian hostility to his address and thought it served as additional proof that Belgium was undermining him. Between September 1960 and January 1961, partly at the instigation of the two countries, Lumumba was deposed from power, arrested and executed with the complicity of both the Congolese and Katangese governments.

Copies of Lumumba's speech were circulated around the Congo. The address initially received a mixed reception within the country. In some quarters it was widely supported. However, some believed that it merely highlighted the fact that Lumumba was inexperienced (and overly provocative) in comparison with Kasa-Vubu's measured and diplomatic approach. Members of Lumumba's own party and Kanza praised the speech itself but believed that the venue in which it had been delivered was inappropriate. The European residents of Katanga Province were particularly angered by it. In Parliament, Albert Kalonji, with the support of other deputies, filed an interpellation against Lumumba, requesting that he explain the provocative nature of his oration. He also wired an apology to Brussels, stating that the Prime Minister's statements did not represent Congolese opinion. Lumumba's address was also acclaimed by figures within the international Pan-African and Black Power movements, including Malcolm X. The speech may have further heightened racial violence between native Congolese and white settlers, who were already distrustful of the new government. As a result of the threat to its expatriates, Belgium deployed troops to the country and, amid mounting violence, several regions of the Congo, notably Katanga, seceded and declared their own independence, starting five-years of violence and political unrest known as the Congo Crisis.

Legacy

While the speech was filmed during its delivery, the film of the speech has only survived as fragments and in some sections only the original audio survives. Transcriptions of the speech were later published in multiple print editions, some of which were altered as propaganda to show Lumumba in a better light after his death in 1961. Today, the speech forms an important part of Congolese popular memory, particularly among "Lumumbists" who claim to represent Lumumba's ideological position in modern Congolese politics.

The scene was painted by Congolese artist Tshibumba Kanda-Matulu in his distinctive cartoon-like style. The result, entitled Le 30 juni 1960, Zaïre indépendant and painted between 1970-1973, hangs in the Virginia Museum of Fine Arts. The speech itself was dramatized in the 2000 film, Lumumba, directed by Raoul Peck in which Eriq Ebouaney played the role of Lumumba. It was backed by a specially composed score, entitled Le Discours ("The Speech"), by the French composer Jean-Claude Petit.

See also
Ambroise Boimbo

Notes and references

Footnotes

References

Bibliography

External links
Transcript of the Speech at Marxists Internet Archive
Discours de l'Indépendance (in French) at the Université de Sherbrooke
King Baudouin Declares Congo Independent at British Pathé
Les discours prononcés par Baudouin Ier, Kasa Vubu et Lumumba lors de la cérémonie de l'indépendance du Congo at Kongo-Kinshasa.de

Political history of the Democratic Republic of the Congo
1960 in the Republic of the Congo (Léopoldville)
1960 in Belgium
Cold War speeches
Speeches about colonialism
Decolonization
June 1960 events in Africa
1960 speeches